Jaime Zobel may refer to:

 Jaime Zóbel de Ayala (born 1934), Filipino businessman and photographer of German and Spanish descent
 Jaime Augusto Zóbel de Ayala (born 1959),  Filipino businessman of German and Spanish parentage, son of the above